Adin Hill (born May 11, 1996) is a Canadian professional ice hockey goaltender for the Vegas Golden Knights of the National Hockey League (NHL). Hill was selected by the Arizona Coyotes, 76th overall, in the 2015 NHL Entry Draft. He has also played with the San Jose Sharks.

Playing career
Hill played bantam junior hockey with the Calgary Bisons before later developing at the midget level with the Calgary Buffaloes in the Alberta Midget Hockey League. He spent the duration of the 2013–14 season with the Calgary Canucks in the Alberta Junior Hockey League before ending the season playing four games of major junior hockey with the Portland Winterhawks of the Western Hockey League.

He spent the entirety of the 2014–15 season with the Winterhawks, where he had a 31–11–1 record and a league-best .921 save percentage. At season's end, he was selected in the third round, 76th overall, by the Arizona Coyotes in the 2015 NHL Entry Draft.

On April 6, 2016, the Coyotes signed Hill to a three-year, entry-level contract. He played for two of the Coyotes' affiliates during the 2016–17 season (the Tucson Roadrunners of the American Hockey League (AHL) and the Rapid City Rush of the ECHL).

Hill began the 2017–18 season with the Roadrunners. However, he was recalled by the Coyotes on October 16, 2017. On October 17, he made his NHL debut, stopping 31 shots in a 3–1 loss to the Dallas Stars. The debut also made him the first goaltender selected in the 2015 draft to appear in an NHL game. On March 13, 2018, Hill recorded his first career win in a 4–3 shootout victory over the Los Angeles Kings. He finished the season with four appearances for the club.

Hill once again began the 2018–19 season with the Roadrunners. He was recalled by the Coyotes on November 24. Hill was named the NHL Second Star of the week for the week of December 3 after posting a 3–0–0 record.

On August 3, 2019, the Coyotes re-signed Hill to a one-year, two-way contract extension. He made 13 appearances during the 2019–20 season, going 2–4–3.

On September 15, 2020, Hill signed a one-year extension with the Coyotes. In the pandemic delayed  season, with injuries to veteran netminders Darcy Kuemper and Antti Raanta, Hill appeared in 19 games for Arizona, earning a 9–9–1 record with a .913 save percentage (SV%) and 2.74 goals-against average (GAA) along with two shutouts. Hill co-led Arizona goaltenders in shutouts and led in save percentage and set a career-high in games played.

On July 17, 2021, due to expansion draft considerations, Hill was traded by the Coyotes, along with the seventh-round pick to the Sharks in exchange for Josef Korenar and a second-round pick in the 2022 NHL Entry Draft. He signed a two-year contract with the Sharks on August 4, 2021. On November 9, 2021, he recorded a two-assist game in a 4–1 win over the Calgary Flames.

Hill was traded to the Vegas Golden Knights on August 29, 2022, in exchange for a fourth-round pick in 2024.

Career statistics

Regular season and playoffs

International

Awards and honours

References

External links
 

1996 births
Living people
Arizona Coyotes draft picks
Arizona Coyotes players
Calgary Canucks players
Canadian expatriate ice hockey players in the United States
Canadian ice hockey goaltenders
Ice hockey people from British Columbia
People from Comox, British Columbia
Portland Winterhawks players
Rapid City Rush players
San Jose Barracuda players
San Jose Sharks players
Springfield Falcons players
Tucson Roadrunners players
Vegas Golden Knights players